Periklis Ilias (born 26 June 1986) is a Greek cross-country mountain biker and road cyclist. 
Periklis became World Champion at the 2012 UCI Mountain Bike Marathon World Championships which was held at Ornans, France.

At the 2012 Summer Olympics, he competed in the Men's cross-country at Hadleigh Farm, finishing in 33rd place.

Major results

Road

2003
 3rd Road race, National Junior Road Championships
2004
 2nd Road race, National Junior Road Championships
2006
 8th Overall Tour of Turkey
2007
 1st  Road race, National Road Championships
2008
 1st Stage 2 Tour of Halkidiki
 5th Road race, National Road Championships
2010
 National Road Championships
3rd Time trial
4th Road race
2012
 4th Overall Tour d'Algérie
 7th Overall Tour of Hellas
2017
 5th Overall Tour of Albania
 10th Overall Tour de Serbie
2019
 3rd Road race, National Road Championships
2020
 National Road Championships
1st  Road race
2nd Time trial

Mountain

2005
 1st  Cross-country, National Mountain-bike Championships
2006
 1st  Cross-country, National Mountain-bike Championships
2007
 1st  Cross-country, National Mountain-bike Championships
2009
 1st  Cross-country, National Mountain-bike Championships
2010
 1st  Cross-country, National Mountain-bike Championships
2011
 1st  Cross-country, National Mountain-bike Championships
2012
 1st  Marathon, UCI World Championships
2013
 1st  Cross-country, National Mountain-bike Championships
2014
 1st  Cross-country, National Mountain-bike Championships
2015
 1st  Marathon, National Mountain-bike Championships
2017
 1st  Marathon, National Mountain-bike Championships

External links 
 Personal Website

References

Greek male cyclists
Cross-country mountain bikers
1986 births
Living people
Olympic cyclists of Greece
Cyclists at the 2012 Summer Olympics
UCI Mountain Bike World Champions (men)
Cyclists at the 2020 Summer Olympics
Sportspeople from Athens
21st-century Greek people